Achaea poliopasta is a species of moth of the family Erebidae first described by George Hampson in 1913. It is found in Cameroon.

References

Endemic fauna of Cameroon
Achaea (moth)
Insects of Cameroon
Erebid moths of Africa
Moths described in 1913